Adam Cesare is an American author of horror novels and short stories. He attended Boston University, where he studied English and film.

Bibliography

Novels and Novellas
Bound By Jade (2012)
Tribesmen (2012)    
Video Night (2013)  
The Summer Job (2014)
The First One You Expect (2014)
Jackpot (2014, with David Bernstein, Shane McKenzie and Kristopher Rufty)
Exponential (2014)
Bottom Feeders (2015, with Cameron Pierce)
Zero Lives Remaining (2015)
Crawling Darkness (2016, with Cameron Pierce)
The Con Season (2016)
Clown in a Cornfield (2020)
Clown in a Cornfield 2: Frendo Lives (2022)

Short Story Collections
Bone Meal Broth (2012)
Short stories collected:
The still
Flies in the Brain
Rollin & Jeanie
Pink Tissue
Border Jumper
Trap
The New Model
The Girls in the Wood
The White Halloween

All-Night Terror (2013, with Matt Serafini)
Short stories collected:
Gore Galore
Bringing Down The Giants
Killing time in the Off-Season
The book was expanded in 2016 with two new stories from each author.

For Adam Cesare, they were:

A New Kind of Image 
Savior Girl in Philly Hell

The Blackest eyes (2016)
Short stories collected:
The Blackest eyes
Me, Debased: A The First One You Expect Side-Story
First short story The Blackest eyes was later added to the 2018 short stories collection Dead Bait 4, Severed Press

Other works
 Leprechaun in the Hood: The Musical: A Novel (serialized online during 2014, with Cameron Pierce and Shane McKenzie)
So bad  in original edition of Zero Lives Remaining, short story, Shock Totem (2015)
Later added to the 2016 expanded edition of Bone meal Broth, Black T-Shirt Books
In the flat light  in Giallo fantastique, short story, World Horde (2015)
Starting early in Dark gallows: 10 Halloween haunts , short story, Scarlet galleon publications LLC (2015)
Also included in the 2017 edition of Zero Lives Remaining, Black T-Shirt Books.
 Readings off the charts in Year's Best Hardcore Horror Volume 1, short story, Comet Press (2016)
 Killing time in the Off-season in The Healing Monsters (Volume 2), short story, Despumation Press (2016)
  The missing years in The gruesome tensome , short story, Novello publishers (2016)
 Please subscribe in Splatterpunk's not dead, short story, CreateSpace Independent Publishing Platform (2016)
Also included in Year's Best Hardcore Horror Volume 2, short story, Comet Press (2017)
 Player agency in Screaming cacti, short story, Thunderstorm Books (2017).
 The morning ritual in Adventure Time 2017 SPOookTACULAR #1, short comics story , BOOM! studios (2017).
 Moist Air in Clickers Forever, short story, Thunderstorm Books (2018)
 Power rangers: in space in Mighty Morphin Power Rangers 2018 Annual Shattered Grid , short comics story , BOOM! studios (2018).
 The southern thing in Welcome to the show, short story, Crystal Lake Publishing (2018).
 A certain kind of forest sound in Centralia: Epicenter, short story, Hustle & Heart Films (2020).
 Jim Henson's The Dark Crystal: Age of Resistance #5-8, comics story , BOOM! studios (2020).
   reprinted as the hardcover graphic novel "Jim Henson's The Dark Crystal: Age of Resistance Vol. 2: The Ballad of Hup & Barfinnious"
 "The Dark Crystal Bestiary: The Definitive Guide to the Creatures of Thra", tie-in book, Insight Editions (2020)
 In the Church and Through the House in Beyond the Book of Eibon, short story, Death Wound Publishing (2021).
 The dogs in my neighborhood in Razorblades issue 4, short story, Tiny Onion Studios (2021).
 Dead Mall #1-4, comics story , Dark Horse Comics (2022-2023).

References

External links

American horror novelists
American male novelists